The men's tournament in the 2013 Rugby World Cup Sevens was held at Luzhniki stadium in Moscow. The tournament was held from 28 June to 30 June, with New Zealand beating England 33−0 at the final.

Teams

Squads

Draw
The band allocation was completed on February 25 in advance of the pool draw on February 28.

The 24 teams were ranked in four bands of six, determined by series points accumulated over the 2010/11 and 2011/12 HSBC Sevens World Series, and the first five rounds of the current 2012/13 Series.

The bands were:

Pool Stage

All times are local (UTC+4).

Pool A
{| class="wikitable" style="text-align: center;"
|-
!width="200"|Teams
!width="40"|Pld
!width="40"|W
!width="40"|D
!width="40"|L
!width="40"|PF
!width="40"|PA
!width="40"|+/−
!width="40"|Pts
|-style="background:#ccffcc"
|align=left| 
|3||2||1||0||78||24||+54||8
|-style="background:#ccffcc"
|align=left| 
|3||2||1||0||62||41||+21||8
|-style="background:#fcc"
|align=left| 
|3||1||0||2||40||88||−48||5
|-style="background:#fcc"
|align=left| 
|3||0||0||3||41||68||−27||3
|}

Pool B
{| class="wikitable" style="text-align: center;"
|-
!width="200"|Teams
!width="40"|Pld
!width="40"|W
!width="40"|D
!width="40"|L
!width="40"|PF
!width="40"|PA
!width="40"|+/−
!width="40"|Pts
|-style="background:#ccffcc"
|align=left| 
|3||3||0||0||105||0||+105||9
|-style="background:#ffe6bd"
|align=left| 
|3||2||0||1||40||63||−23||7
|-style="background:#fcc"
|align=left| 
|3||0||1||2||29||64||−35||4
|-style="background:#fcc"
|align=left| 
|3||0||1||2||17||64||−47||4
|}

Pool C
{| class="wikitable" style="text-align: center;"
|-
!width="200"|Teams
!width="40"|Pld
!width="40"|W
!width="40"|D
!width="40"|L
!width="40"|PF
!width="40"|PA
!width="40"|+/−
!width="40"|Pts
|-style="background:#ccffcc"
|align=left| 
|3||3||0||0||93||22||+71||9
|-style="background:#ffe6bd"
|align=left| 
|3||2||0||1||62||31||+31||7
|-style="background:#ffe6bd"
|align=left| 
|3||1||0||2||38||59||−21||5
|-style="background:#fcc"
|align=left| 
|3||0||0||3||12||93||−81||3
|}

Pool D
{| class="wikitable" style="text-align: center;"
|-
!width="200"|Teams
!width="40"|Pld
!width="40"|W
!width="40"|D
!width="40"|L
!width="40"|PF
!width="40"|PA
!width="40"|+/−
!width="40"|Pts
|-style="background:#ccffcc"
|align=left| 
|3||3||0||0||83||38||+45||9
|-style="background:#ffe6bd"
|align=left| 
|3||2||0||1||53||64||−11||7
|-style="background:#ffe6bd"
|align=left| 
|3||1||0||2||59||60||−1||5
|-style="background:#fcc"
|align=left| 
|3||0||0||3||45||78||−33||3
|}

Pool E
{| class="wikitable" style="text-align: center;"
|-
!width="200"|Teams
!width="40"|Pld
!width="40"|W
!width="40"|D
!width="40"|L
!width="40"|PF
!width="40"|PA
!width="40"|+/−
!width="40"|Pts
|-style="background:#ccffcc"
|align=left| 
|3||3||0||0||80||38||+42||9
|-style="background:#ccffcc"
|align=left| 
|3||2||0||1||106||19||+87||7
|-style="background:#ffe6bd"
|align=left| 
|3||1||0||2||55||73||−18||5
|-style="background:#fcc"
|align=left| 
|3||0||0||3||5||116||−111||3
|}

Pool F
{| class="wikitable" style="text-align: center;"
|-
!width="200"|Teams
!width="40"|Pld
!width="40"|W
!width="40"|D
!width="40"|L
!width="40"|PF
!width="40"|PA
!width="40"|+/−
!width="40"|Pts
|-style="background:#ccffcc"
|align=left| 
|3||3||0||0||73||26||+47||9
|-style="background:#ffe6bd"
|align=left| 
|3||1||0||2||69||38||+31||5
|-style="background:#ffe6bd"
|align=left| 
|3||1||0||2||38||48||−10||5
|-style="background:#fcc"
|align=left| 
|3||1||0||2||31||99||−68||5
|}

Knockout stage

Bowl

Plate

Cup

Leading Scorers

Source:

References

Men
World Cup Sevens
World Cup Sevens
Sports competitions in Moscow